YRF  (Youth Renewal Fund), a non-profit organization, is the US partners of Darca schools - a network of 28 high schools and two learning centers in disadvantaged communities in Israel. YRF provides strategic guidance, research and philanthropic support to Darca Schools.

History 
YRF was founded in 1989 in New York City as a grassroots effort to improve the available academic opportunities  for underprivileged students in Israel. It grew to become an implementer of supplemental education programs in Israel's periphery. A study conducted by the organization proved that the programs provided were making an impact in closing the educational gap between wealthy and poor.

In August 2008, YRF launched a multi-year Teacher Professional Development Program, one of the first of its kind in Israel. In its pilot year, the program served nearly 200 YRF teachers. YRF has implemented over $25 million in programming, reaching more than 75,000 Israeli children.

Board of directors
Marc Rowan – Chairman; Paul Schnell – President; Sam Katz – Past President

Members of the Board 
Anne Angowitz; Stuart Angowitz; Ram Burshtine; Sam Camens; Harlan Cherniak; Jeff Cohen ;Jamie Easton; Danny Epstien; David Feldman; Jeffrey Freed; Jeff Gimbel; Michael Gross; Jordana Grunfeld; Scott Hoffman; Sam Katz; Doug Korn; Randye Kwait; Ken Lande; Ivan Lehon; Sherie Moalemzadeh; Bret Pearlman; Ilene Penn; Allison Rosen; Bennett Rosenthal; Marc Rowan; Jordan Sall; Paul Schnell; Robert Schwartz; Jamie Schweid Robert Sheft; Hope Taitz; Ross Weiner

Executive Committee

Harlan Cherniak; Jamie Easton; Jeff Gimbel; Sam Katz; Randye Kwait; Paul Schnell; Robert Schwartz

Notes and references

See also 
 Bagrut
 Education in Israel
 Israel's National Student and Youth Council
 Ministry of Education (Israel)
 The Knesset Committee on Education, Culture and Sport

External links 
 YRF Official Website
 Darca -  BRINGING OUT THE BEST
 Article: Bridging Social, Educational and Economic Gaps
 Darca Education System Thriving Across the Country, The Jerusalem Post, August 17, 2015

Educational organizations based in Israel
International schools in Israel
Schools in Israel
Non-profit organizations based in Israel